James Arthur Salter, 1st Baron Salter,  (15 March 1881 – 27 June 1975) was a British politician and academic, who played a minor, but important role in the foundations of pan-European government.

Background and education
Salter was the eldest son of James Edward Salter (1857–1937) of the Thames boating company Salters Steamers, and who became Mayor of Oxford in 1909. Educated at Oxford City High School and Brasenose College, Oxford, where he was a scholar, he graduated with first class honours in Literae Humaniores in 1903.

Career

Salter joined the Civil Service in 1904 and worked in the transport department of the Admiralty, on national insurance, and as private secretary, being promoted to Assistant Secretary grade in 1913. On the outbreak of war, he was recalled to the Admiralty, and became director of ship requisitioning. He was sent to Washington D.C. to press for a US programme of new construction.

In 1917–18 he was a colleague of Jean Monnet in the Chartering Committee of the Allied Maritime Transport Council, and in 1919 appointed secretary of the Supreme Economic Council in Paris. Salter then worked as head of the economic and financial section of the League of Nations secretariat, and in the League secretariat at Geneva, where he worked for stabilization of currencies of Austria and Hungary and resettlement of refugees in Greece and Bulgaria. In the 1920s, having seen the League of Nations fail through the vested interests of individual countries, Monnet and Salter worked together to develop plans for the establishment of a 'United States of Europe', headed by an unelected technocrat government.

He returned to London in 1930, and worked as journalist and author. In 1932, he presided over a Conference on Road and Rail Transport tasked with looking at the true costs and benefits of transport, and whose results were known as the Salter Report. It recommended changes to the way that public roads were funded to account for the growing demands of the motor car and road freight, and to ensure that road and rail were evenly regulated and competed fairly.

In 1934, he was appointed Gladstone professor of political theory and institutions at Oxford University, and a fellow of All Souls College, Oxford. He was Independent Member of Parliament (MP) for Oxford University from 1937 to 1950.

On outbreak of war in 1939, he resumed his role in shipping, being appointed Parliamentary Secretary to the Ministry of Shipping.

In summer 1940, he once more worked with Jean Monnet on a proposal to politically unify Britain and France as a bastion against Nazism. Whilst the paper was rejected, it reignited the possibility of pan-European government. Later, Salter headed the British shipping mission to Washington from 1941 to 1943, where he once more came into contact with Monnet, and they worked to interest President Roosevelt in the 'European project'. These seeds would go on to bear fruit, as in 1948, the Americans would establish, and fund, the foundations of pan-European government.

He was appointed a Privy Counsellor in 1941. In 1944 he was appointed deputy director-general of the United Nations Relief and Rehabilitation Administration. He served as Chancellor of the Duchy of Lancaster in the short-lived Churchill caretaker ministry (May–July 1945).

He was elected as Conservative MP for Ormskirk from 1951 to 1953, and served as Minister of State for Economic Affairs at the Treasury, and as Minister of Materials in 1952. Rab Butler, the Chancellor of the Exchequer, claimed that Churchill called Salter "the greatest economist since Jesus Christ". Butler's biographer Anthony Howard writes that Salter was "never more than a minor, and sometimes visible, irritant to the new Chancellor". Butler called him "Micawber Salter" because of his opposition to Butler's proposal to let the pound float ("Operation ROBOT").

In the mid-1950s he was invited by Nuri al-Said to be one of the external members of the Iraqi government's Development Board; while working with this board, he produced what came to be known as " the Salter report" on industrial development of the Iraqi economy. He was raised to the peerage as Baron Salter, of Kidlington in the County of Oxford, on 16 October 1953. He had received many honours during his career, being first appointed a Companion of the Bath in 1918, a Knight Commander of the Bath in 1922, and a GBE in 1944. His peerage became extinct when he died in 1975, aged 94.

Bibliography
 Aster, Sidney, Power, Policy and Personality:  The Life and Times of Lord Salter, 1881– 1975, Amazon, 2016.  .
 
 Howard, Anthony, RAB: The Life of R. A. Butler, London, Jonathan Cape 1987. .
Le Dréau, Christophe, Arthur Salter face à la construction européenne (1929–1951), Mémoire de DEA de l'Université Paris I Sorbonne, sous la direction de Robert Frank, 1999, 232p.
James Arthur Salter, Allied Shipping Control, Oxford, 1921.
Sir Arthur Salter, Toward a Planned Economy, John Day 1934.
James Arthur Salter, Slave of the Lamp: a Public Servant's Notebook, London, 1967.

References
List of Ministers

External links 

 
The Papers of Lord Salter held at Churchill Archives Centre

|-

1881 births
1975 deaths
20th-century Royal Navy personnel
Alumni of Brasenose College, Oxford
Civil servants in the Admiralty
Civil servants in the Ministry of National Insurance
Conservative Party (UK) MPs for English constituencies
European integration pioneers
Fellows of All Souls College, Oxford
Independent members of the House of Commons of the United Kingdom
Knights Commander of the Order of the Bath
Knights Grand Cross of the Order of the British Empire
Mayors of Oxford
Members of the Parliament of the United Kingdom for the University of Oxford
Members of the Privy Council of the United Kingdom
Ministers in the Chamberlain wartime government, 1939–1940
Ministers in the Churchill caretaker government, 1945
Ministers in the Churchill wartime government, 1940–1945
Ministers in the third Churchill government, 1951–1955
People educated at the City of Oxford High School for Boys
Private secretaries in the British Civil Service
UK MPs 1935–1945
UK MPs 1945–1950
UK MPs 1951–1955
UK MPs who were granted peerages
Hereditary barons created by Elizabeth II
Chancellors of the Duchy of Lancaster
Member of the Mont Pelerin Society